Genagra is a village in the Famagusta District of Cyprus, located 5 km  southwest of Lefkoniko, just south of Lefkoniko Airport. It is under the de facto control of Northern Cyprus.

References

Communities in Famagusta District
Populated places in Gazimağusa District